is a female Japanese manga artist who once worked as an assistant to Miho Obana. Her works were initially serialized in Ribon before being published in tankōbon volumes by Shueisha. She has also been featured in one of Shueisha's shōnen publications, Jump SQ.

Works

References

External links
  (archive) 
 Artist profile and interviews at Ribon Shueisha 
 

Women manga artists
Manga artists from Tokyo
1982 births
Living people
People from Fussa, Tokyo
Japanese female comics artists
Female comics writers
Japanese women writers